Marjorie Harness Goodwin is an American anthropologist, currently Distinguished Professor at University of California, Los Angeles, and also a published author of books.

Education
She received her PhD from the University of Pennsylvania and her honorary PhD from Uppsala University.

References

Year of birth missing (living people)
Living people
American anthropologists
University of California, Los Angeles faculty
University of Pennsylvania alumni